The following notable startups have completed the Y Combinator Accelerator program.

Mike Isaac described Y Combinator as: "Y Combinator accepts batches of start-ups twice a year in a semester-like system and gives them money, advice and access to a vast network of start-up founders and technologists who can advise them."

2005−2006 

 Clustrix
 Loopt
 OMGPop
 Reddit
 Scribd
 Xobni
 YouOS

2007–2008 

 280 North
 AppJet
 Biographicon
 Disqus
 Dropbox
 Heroku
 Justin.tv
 Ninite
 Octopart
 Parakey
 Posterous
 Songkick
 Virtualmin
 Weebly

2009−2010 

 1000Memories
 Airbnb
 Bump
 Homejoy
 Listia
 Mixpanel
 Optimizely
 OwnLocal
 PagerDuty
 Recurse Center (Hacker School)
 RethinkDB
 Stripe
 WakeMate
 WePay

2011 

 Circle
 Codecademy
 drchrono
 Firebase
 HackerRank 
 Humble Bundle
 Lanyrd
 LeadGenius
 MemSQL
 Meteor
 MongoHQ
 OrderAhead
 Parse
 Pebble (watch)
 Quartzy
 Science Exchange
 Upverter
 Verbling
 Vidyard
 ZeroCater

2012 

 9GAG
 Boosted 
 BufferBox
 Canopy Labs
 Coinbase
 Diaspora
 Double Robotics
 Exec
 Fullstack Academy
 Gusto
 Hackpad
 Instacart
 Kamcord
 LendUp
 LightTable
 PlanGrid
 Socialcam
 Survata
 Swiftype
 The Muse (The Daily Muse)
 Tilt.com
 Zapier

2013 

 7 Cups 
 Airware
 Bitnami
 Container Linux (CoreOS Linux)
 CrowdMed
 DoorDash
 Experiment 
 Goldbelly
 Strikingly
 Teespring
 True Link
 Watsi
 Webflow
 Zenefits

2014–2015 

 80,000 Hours
 AirPair
 Algolia
 Bluesmart
 Cofactor Genomics
 Flexport
 Gigster
 GitLab
 Kickback
 Lumi
 Move Loot
 Paribus
 Platzi
 Product Hunt
 Quora
 Rigetti Computing
uBiome
 Unbabel
 Zesty
 Zidisha

2016−2018 

 Boom Technology
 Brex
 Coub
 LendEDU
 Modal Commerce (Drive Motors)
 Netomi (msg.ai)
 Rappi
 Replit
 Women Who Code

2019−2020 

 Our World in Data
 Upsolve

References

Sources
 TechCrunch Article on YC Demo Day 1 for Summer 2015
 TechCrunch Article on YC Demo Day 2 for Summer 2015
 YCList.com
 Here are the 63 Startups That Launched Today at Y Combinator's S18 Demo Day 1
 All 59 Startups that Launched Today at Y Combinator's S18 Demo Day 2
 YC Summer 2018 Batch Stats
 6 Companies from the YC Summer 2018 Batch
 9 companies from the YC Summer 2018 Batch
 15 Companies from the YC Summer 2018 Batch
 16 Companies from the YC Summer 2018 Batch
13 Companies From YC Winter 2018
9 Companies from the YC W19 Batch
13 Companies from the YC Winter 2019 Batch Part 2
17 Companies from the YC Winter 2019 Batch Part 4

External links
 "YC Companies" at ycombinator.com

Y Combinator